Mario Sauer (born 15 May 2004) is a Slovak professional footballer who currently plays for Fortuna Liga club MŠK Žilina as a midfielder.

Club career

MŠK Žilina
Sauer made his Fortuna Liga debut for Žilina against Spartak Trnava on 16 May 2021. He came on in the second half replacing Vahan Bichakhchyan.

References

External links
 MŠK Žilina official club profile 
 
 Futbalnet profile 
 

2004 births
Living people
Slovak footballers
Slovakia youth international footballers
Association football midfielders
MŠK Žilina players
2. Liga (Slovakia) players
Slovak Super Liga players